Tere Sheher Mein is an Indian television drama series which aired on Star Plus from 2 March 2015 to 14 November 2015. The show was created by producer Rajan Shahi of Director's Kut Productions and starred Hiba Nawab, Dhruv Bhandari, Rafi Malik, Anjum Fakih, Gautami Kapoor, Sana Amin Sheikh and Kinshuk Mahajan.

Plot
Amaya Mathur lives happily in Paris, while her parents and sisters live in Mumbai. As Rishi becomes bankrupt and commits suicide, the Mathurs lose their property in Mumbai and Paris and move back to their hometown Banaras. Hari is imprisoned due to Rishi's bankruptcy crisis. Rachita turns out to be Sneha and Dev Agnihotri's daughter, whom Rishi gave his name after marrying Sneha. She befriends Rama Gupta who falls for her; they later get engaged.

Amaya and Mantu Srivastava fall in love. Dev returns and tells Rachita's illegitimacy to Sumitra, who threatens the Mathurs that she will reveal the truth publicly. But Amaya instead weds Rama to protect her family. Heartbroken Mantu leaves Banaras. Amaya learns Kangana is traditional during the day but acts like modern at night, under the name "Kanika". Later it's revealed that Kanika is Kangana's long lost twin sister, but Amaya still thinks they're the same people.

Amaya realises, Kangana has split personality disorder, needing an operation. To collect money Amaya sells her jewellery and Rama takes up a competition fighting with the greedy and evil Tilak, and wins. She and Rama get closer and fall in love. Amaya's in-laws finally accept her after Kangana's successful treatment. Tilak kills Mantu. The show ends on a happy note as Amaya and Rama remarry and live happily ever after.

Cast

Main
Hiba Nawab as Amaya Mathur Gupta – Rishi and Sneha's elder daughter; Gajanan and Pushpa's grand-daughter; Rachita's half-sister; Jasmine's sister; Mantu's lover; Rama's wife
Rafi Malik as Ramashrey "Rama" Gupta – Sumitra's son; Kangana and Kanika's cousin; Rachita's former fiancé; Amaya's husband
Dhruv Bhandari as Abhimanyu "Mantu" Srivastava – Chiklu's brother; Uma's best friend; Amaya's lover

Recurring
Gautami Gadgill Kapoor as Sneha Rishi Mathur (née Choubey) – Gajanan and Pushpa's daughter; Dev's former girlfriend; Rishi's wife; Rachita, Amaya and Jasmine's mother
Sachin Tyagi as Rishi Mathur – Sneha's husband; Hari's friend; Rachita's adoptive father; Amaya and Jasmine's father
Anjum Fakih as Rachita Agnihotri/Rachita Mathur – Dev and Sneha's daughter; Gajanan and Pushpa's grand-daughter; Rishi's adoptive daughter; Amaya and Jasmine's half-sister; Rohan and Rama's former fiancée 
Sana Amin Sheikh as
Kangana Gupta – Kanika's twin sister; Rama's cousin sister
Kanika Gupta – Kangana's twin sister; Rama's cousin sister
Isha Mishra as Jasmine Mathur – Rishi and Sneha's younger daughter; Rachita's half-sister; Amaya's sister
Kinshuk Mahajan as Tilak Rajawat – Rama's arch enemy; Mantu's murderer
Mrinal Kaur as Uma Kaushal – Mantu's friend
S. M. Zaheer as Gajanan Choubey – Pushpa's husband; Sneha's father; Rachita, Amaya and Jasmine's grandfather
Aarya Dharmchand Kumar as Rudra Bhardwaj – Hari's son
Beena Banerjee as Pushpa Choubey – Gajanan's wife; Sneha's mother; Rachita, Amaya and Jasmine's grandmother
 Abha Parmar as Rimjhim Gupta
 Sunita Shirole as Baa
 Iqbal Azad as Hari Bhardwaj, Rishi's friend
 Paritosh Sand as Advocate Shekhar Sinha 
 Raymon Singh as Mrs. Singh
 Amit Behl as News Channel Editor 
 Digvijay Purohit as Mr. Garewal, Rohan's father
 Mohit Chauhan as A.C.P. Bhagat
 Arsh Khan as Chintu "Chiklu" Srivastava, Mantu's brother
 Bhupinder Singh as Dev Agnihotri: Rachita's father
 Neeraj Malviya as Rohan Garewal: Rachita's ex-fiancé
 Seema Raj as Mohini Gupta
 Priyanshu Singh

Special appearances
Hina Khan as Akshara Maheshwari Singhania from Yeh Rishta Kya Kehlata Hai.
Deepika Singh as Sandhya Kothari Rathi from Diya Aur Baati Hum.
Devoleena Bhattacharjee as Gopi Kapadia Modi from Saath Nibhaana Saathiya
Divyanka Tripathi as Dr. Ishita Iyer Bhalla from Ye Hai Mohabbatein.
 Rajshri Rani as Suhani Srivastav Birla from Suhani Si Ek Ladki.
Digangana Suryavanshi as Veera Singh Singh from Ek Veer Ki Ardaas...Veera

Production

Filming
Some early episodes of the show were shot in Paris and Mumbai. The show was set in Varanasi.

Casting
Hiba Nawab and Dhruv Bhandari were initially cast as the main leads of the series. However, after Bhandari quit, recurring cast Rafi Malik became the main lead opposite Nawab.

Initially Anjum Faikh auditioned for character Amaya, but did not get accepted due to her height and later got cast for Rachita.

References

External links
 Tere Sheher Mein on hotstar

2015 Indian television series debuts
2015 Indian television series endings
StarPlus original programming
Indian drama television series
Television shows set in Uttar Pradesh